The 1999 Stanford Cardinal football team represented Stanford University in the 1999 NCAA Division I-A football season. In head coach Tyrone Willingham's fifth season at Stanford, the Cardinal won the Pacific-10 Conference championship for the first time since 1971, earning its first Rose Bowl appearance since that season, and its first-ever BCS appearance.

Schedule

Roster

Game Summaries

at No. 17 Texas

Washington State

at No. 19 Arizona

No. 21 UCLA

San Jose State

Oregon State

at USC

at Washington

at Arizona State

California

Notre Dame

vs. No. 4 Wisconsin (Rose Bowl Game)

Awards and honors
Troy Walters, 1999 consensus All-American and Fred Biletnikoff Award winner as college football's best wide receiver

References

Stanford
Pac-12 Conference football champion seasons
Stanford Cardinal football seasons
Stanford Cardinal football